Lukáš Hůlka (born 31 March 1995) is a professional Czech football defender playing for Bohemians 1905 in the Czech First League.

Club career
Hůlka started playing football in the junior categories of FK Mladá Boleslav, where he won two junior titles in 2013 and 2015. He made his debut for Mladá Boleslav in UEFA Europa League qualifying match against NK Široki Brijeg in July 2014.

He made his league debut on 13 September 2015 in Mladá Boleslav's 1–0 away loss against FC Baník Ostrava. He plays his entire career in the Czech First League. After a loan spell at Bohemians 1905 in the 2017/2018 season, he transferred to that club in 2019. Since then, he has become a regular in the starting line-up and played over 110 games for Bohemians.

International career
Hůlka went through all the youth national teams. He made one appearance for Czech Republic national under-21 football team in 2016.

References

External links

Lukáš Hůlka Official international statistics

1995 births
Living people
Czech footballers
Czech Republic under-21 international footballers
Czech First League players
FK Mladá Boleslav players
FC Hradec Králové players
Bohemians 1905 players
Association football defenders
Sportspeople from Mladá Boleslav